Vyjayanthimala is a former Bollywood and Kollywood actress who also appears in Tollywood and Bengali films. With the multilingual film Vazhkai, Jeevitham and Bahar, she was introduced into the world of cinema by A. V. Meiyappan and discovered by M. V. Raman. She achieved stardom with the blockbuster Nagin (1954). After the success of that films, her career later focused more on Bollywood films where most of her films was commercially successful besides being received well by critics. She also occasionally made appearances in Tamil films where she was also regarded as one of the successful actresses in the industry. Beside her ability as an actress, she was also accomplish dancer who introduced semi-classical dance in Bollywood films and predated the concept of item number. Furthermore, she was the first South Indian actress who becomes a national star which paved the way for other South Indian actress to foray into Bollywood.

In addition of acting recognition, Vyjayanthimala also receive some honors for her achievement in classical dance where she was a trained Bharata Natyam dancer. Apart from acting in film she was also occasionally perform her dance show in al over the India and abroad.

Acting Awards

Apsara Film & Television Producers Guild Awards
The Apsara Film & Television Producers Guild Awards is presented by the Bollywood film industry to honour and recognize the professional excellence of their peers. Vyjayanthimala has received one special award for her contribution for Bollywood film industry.

Akkineni International Foundation Award
The ANR National Award is an annual award to recognize people for their lifetime achievements and contributions to the Indian film industry. The award was instituted in the honour of actor Akkineni Nageswara Rao which was equivalent to Dadasaheb Phalke Award. Vyjayanthimala had won the ANR National Award in 2008. She was selected by the 3 member of jury which include T. Subbarami Reddy, D. Ramanaidu and Boney Kapoor. The award carries  4 lakhs in cash, memento and citation. She received the award from Y. S. Rajasekhara Reddy, the then Chief Minister of Andhra Pradesh, at an event was held at Jubilee Hills.

Bengal Film Journalists' Association Award
The Bengal Film Journalists' Association Awards is the oldest Association of Film critics in India, founded in 1937, by the inspiration and determination of the handful of pioneers amongst the then thin section of scribes that were drawn to film journalism with a lofty mission to serve the developing film journalism and film industry. Vyjayanthimala has won two Best Actress awards in the Hindi film category.

Bollywood Movie Award
The Bollywood Movie Awards was an annual film award ceremony held between 1999 and 2007 celebrating films and actors from the Bollywood film industry based in Mumbai, India. Vyjayanthimala received the lifetime achievement award in 2005 for her contribution to Hindi films.

FICCI Living Legend
The Federation of Indian Chambers of Commerce and Industry (FICCI) funds and supports many governmental and non-governmental educational institutions across the country. Vyjayanthimala received the Living Legend Award from the federation in recognition of her outstanding contribution to the Indian entertainment industry.

Film Fans' Association Award
Vyjayanthimala won the Best Tamil Actress Award (Second Prize) at the 1st Film Fans' Association Award for her debut film Vazhkai where she secured 1,676 votes.

Filmfare Award
The Filmfare Awards are presented annually by The Times Group to honour both artistic and technical excellence of professionals in the Hindi language film industry of India. Vyjayanthimala has won four awards from five nominations, including a Lifetime Achievement Award for her contribution in Bollywood. She was the first person to decline a Filmfare Award, when she refused the Filmfare Award for Best Supporting Actress for Devdas, as she stated that the roles of Chandramukhi and Paro, played by Vyjayanthimala and Suchitra Sen respectively, were parallel and of equal importance. Vyjayanthimala is the fifth most-frequent winner of the Best Actress award with three wins, behind Nutan and Kajol with five wins, Meena Kumari and Madhuri Dixit with four wins. She also holds the record for winning the award in any category for each year she was nominated in.

International film festivals
Vyjayanthimala had been honored in various film festivals across the globe. She was awarded under the Lifetime achievement Award category.

Kalakar Awards
Kalakar Awards is recognized as one of the leading awards ceremonies of East India. The brand Kalakar is all about a vision and the relentless pursuit towards its success. The ceremony was visioned by Shri Ashok Kalanauria. Vyjayanthimala has received the Lifetime Achievement Award at the 10th Kalakar Awards.

Stardust Awards
The Stardust Awards are presented by Stardust magazine. They are presented annually to honour professional excellence in the Hindi language film industry of India. Vyjayanthimala was honored with the "Pride of Film Industry Award" for her contribution to Hindi cinema.

Tamil Nadu State Film Award
Tamil Nadu State Film Awards are the most notable film awards given for Tamil films in India. They are given annually to honour the best talents and provide encouragement and incentive to the South Indian film industry by the Government of Tamil Nadu. The awards are decided by a committee headed by a jury. Vyjayanthimala was bestowed with the Thyagaraja Bhagavathar Award for her contribution in Tamil cinema. The award was instituted in the honour of actor M. K. Thyagaraja Bhagavathar.

Anandalok Pusarkar Award 
Anandalok Puraskar ceremony is an award ceremony for Bengali film in India. The Anandalok, only film magazine in Bengali language, published from Ananda Publishers and Ananda Bazar Patrika presents this award (Puraskar). The magazine was started on 25 January 1975 and the awards ceremony was started in 1998. Vyjayanthimala was honored with the Lifetime Achievement Award, which was handed over by Prosenjit Chatterjee

Classical Dance

 1973 - Arasavai Natya Kalaingnar from Government of Tamil Nadu for excellence in Bharatanatyam
 1982 - Sangeet Natak Akademi Award for Lifetime achievement in Bharatanatyam
 1998 - Nadabrahmam Award from Narada Gana Sabha
 1999 - TTK memorial award from Madras Music Academy
 2002 - Nrithya Rathnakara Award by Bhairavi Fine Arts Society during Cleveland Thyagaraja Aradhana at Cleveland, Ohio, United States
 2005 - Sanskriti Kalashree Award from Sanskriti Organization
 2005 - Lifetime Achievement Award from The Rotary Club of Chennai, Kilpauk, Chennai
 2006 - Gnana Kala Bharathi award from Bharat Kalachar for achievement in Bharata Natyam
 2007 - Kalaratna Mala Award at 38th annual Bhajan Samaroh
 2009 - Yagnaraman Lifetime Achievement Award
 2009 - Natyakala Tapaswini award from Sri Ramakrishna Alva Memorial
 2010 - Bharatha Kalai Arasi award from Sri Madhavi Natyalaya Institute
 2010 - E. Krishna Iyer Medal from Sruti Foundation for her outstanding contributions to Bharatanatyam in a distinguished career spread over seven decades
 2011 - Naatya Padhmam award from Brahma Gana Sabha
 2011 - Natya Kala Shikamani award from All India Fine Arts and Crafts Society and Apollo Hospitals
 2011 - Shanmukhananda National Eminence Award from Shanmukhananda Hall
 2011 - Vocational Service Awards Lifetime Achievement for Bharatanatyam from Rotary Club of Chennai Towers
 2011 - Lifetime Achievement Award from Kartik Fine Arts
 2012 - Sangeet Natak Akademi Tagore Ratna as a part of the ongoing commemoration of the 150th Birth Anniversary of Gurudev Rabindranath Tagore for her significant contribution in the field of performing arts

National & international honors
 1968 - Padma Shri Award from Government of India
 1979 - Tamil Nadu State Artist Award from Government of Tamil Nadu by M. G. Ramachandran
 1979 - Kalaimamani from Government of Tamil Nadu
 1995 - Honorary doctorate from Annamalai University
 2001 - The Federation of Indo-American Associations of North California invited her to be Grand Marshal for auspices of the Indian Independence Day on August 12 and 13 of 2001.
 2001 - Lifetime achievement from The Federation of Indo-American Associations of North California at Silicon Valley
 2003 - Lifetime achievement from Amir Khusro Sangeet Academy for contribution to the arts
 2004 - Legend of Indian Cinema Award at Atlantic City, United States
 2005 - Bangalore Gayana Samaja Centenary Award by Government of Karnataka
 2006 - Sivaji Ganesan Award by Sivaji Prabhu charity trust
 2007 - Ambassador for Peace Award from Universal Peace Federation
 2008 - Honored by Mayor of St. Louis for her contribution to art
 2008 - Sivaji Ganesan Awards of Excellence
 2010 - Rajinikanth Legend Award for excellence in cinema under Bhishma category by The Ashram
 2010 - National Integration Award from T. Subbarami Reddy Kalapeetham Awards
 2011 - Honored by the Government of France for visiting France during the filming of Sangam
 2011 - Padmabhushan B. Sarojadevi National Award

See also
 Vyjayanthimala
 Vyjayanthimala filmography

|-
! colspan="3" style="background: #DAA520;" | Filmfare Awards
|-

|-
|-

|-
|-

|-
|-

|-
|-

|-

References

External links
 List of awards and nominations received by Vyjayanthimala at the Internet Movie Database
 Vyjayanthimala profile at Upperstall.com

Lists of awards received by Indian actor